Tri-County North High School is a public high school located in Lewisburg, Ohio. Their mascot is the panther. They offer basketball, archery, cross country, football, volleyball, soccer, baseball, golf, wrestling, and softball teams. Their main athletic rival is Twin Valley South High School, based in West Alexandria, Ohio.

References

High schools in Preble County, Ohio
Public high schools in Ohio